Gas focusing, also known as ionic focusing.

Rather than being dispersed, a beam of charged particles travelling in an inert gas environment sometimes becomes narrower.  This is ascribed to the generation of gas ions which diffuse outwards, neutralizing the particle beam globally, and producing an intense radial electric field which applies a radially inward force to the particles in the beam.

See also 
 Vacuum tube
 Teleforce

References
 Sabchevski S P and Mladenov G M 1994 J. Physics D: Applied Physics 27 690-697
 Mladenov G., and Sabchevski S., Potential distribution and  space-charge  neutralization in intense electron beams - an overview "Vacuum", 2001,v62, N2-3, pp. 113–122

External links 
 Ionic focusing

Plasma physics